Lloyd Benjamin Spencer (May 15, 1890 – September 1, 1970) was a Major League Baseball outfielder. Spencer played for the Washington Senators in the 1913 season. In eight games, he had six hits in 21 at-bats for a .286 batting average. Spencer batted and threw left-handed.

Spencer was born in Patapsco, Maryland, and died in Finksburg, Maryland.

Spencer was the grandfather of former Major Leaguer Jim Spencer.

External links
Baseball Reference.com page

1890 births
1970 deaths
Washington Senators (1901–1960) players
Baseball players from Maryland